Christian Ramirez may refer to:

 Christian Ignacio Ramírez, Mexican footballer
 Christian Ramírez (footballer, born 1978), Mexican footballer
 Christian Ramirez (soccer, born 1991), American soccer player

See also 
 Cristian Ramirez (disambiguation)